David J.C. Shafer is an American author. His first novel Whiskey Tango Foxtrot was published by Mulholland Books on August 5, 2014. His work has appeared in The New York Times, Salon, The Irish Times, The Harvard Crimson, The Daily Beast, Willamette Week and Portland Monthly.

Born and raised in New York City, he graduated from Harvard College and the Columbia School of Journalism. He has lived in Dublin and Buenos Aires. David Shafer now lives in Portland, Oregon with his wife, daughter and son.

References

External links 
 A Scandal at the C.I.A. Maybe.
 I wish I’d loved my dog more: Teenage nostalgia, first loves, and pining for the wrong past
 Amazon's Fight With Hachette Strands an Author in the Crossfire
 Roth's Latest Tells Compelling Story of Hormonal Misanthrope
 Rushdie Stuns with Last Sigh
 Wweek.com
 Wweek.com

Living people
21st-century American novelists
Harvard University alumni
Writers from Portland, Oregon
American male novelists
Columbia University Graduate School of Journalism alumni
21st-century American male writers
Novelists from Oregon
Year of birth missing (living people)